Andaokut is a Native American mythological figure of the Nuu-chah-nulth people. He is a giant boy born from the tears of a woman mourning the loss of her child, which was stolen by Malahas. He ventures through the forest to find Malahas, slay her, and rescue the children she abducted.

References 

Nuu-chah-nulth mythology